Alun Davies (born 30 June 1963) is a Caymanian sailor. He competed in the Tornado event at the 1996 Summer Olympics.

References

External links
 

1963 births
Living people
Caymanian male sailors (sport)
Olympic sailors of the Cayman Islands
Sailors at the 1996 Summer Olympics – Tornado
Place of birth missing (living people)